Matthew Jim Elliott FRSA (born 12 February 1978) is a British political strategist and lobbyist who has served as the chief executive of a number of organisations and been involved in various referendum campaigns, including Vote Leave.

Elliott was the founder and has served as chief executive of the TaxPayers' Alliance in 2004, Big Brother Watch and Business for Britain.

He has also worked as a political strategist, acting as campaign director for the successful NOtoAV campaign in the 2011 Alternative Vote referendum. In 2015, Elliott became the chief executive of Vote Leave, the official organisation advocating for a 'leave' vote in the 2016 United Kingdom European Union membership referendum. He was described as "...one of the most successful political campaigners in Westminster today." In 2018, The Guardian described him as a central figure in "a network of opaquely funded organisations", mostly based at 55 Tufton Street, that "centre around... the TaxPayers’ Alliance – a pressure group that he founded – and Brexit Central, an anti-EU website of which [he was then] editor-in-chief".

Personal life and education 
Elliott was born in Leeds and attended Leeds Grammar School. He graduated with a First in BSc Government from the London School of Economics in 2000. Whilst at the LSE, he was President of the LSESU Hayek Society. Since 2014, he has been a trustee of the Social Affairs Unit, a right-leaning think-tank.

Elliott has been described by the BBC as "one of the most effective lobbyists at Westminster", and in 2010 was named by Total Politics magazine as one of the top 25 political influencers in the UK. In 2017 he was placed at Number 85 in commentator Iain Dale's list of 'The Top 100 Most Influential People on the Right'.

Elliott is married to Sarah Elliott (née Smith), Chairwoman of Republicans Overseas UK. The couple have one daughter and live in a flat in the South London Borough of Brixton.

Career 
Elliott served as press officer for the European Foundation from 2000, and political secretary to Timothy Kirkhope MEP from 2001.

Lobbying 
In 2004, Elliott co-founded the TaxPayers' Alliance with Andrew Allum. He served as Chief executive of the organisation until 2014.

In 2009, he founded the civil liberties and privacy pressure group Big Brother Watch, in response to "the prevailing climate of authoritarian and intrusive policies being pursued by the British state".

In 2012, he was also a founding member of Conservative Friends of Russia. According to the New Statesman, "Elliott did attend a Conservative Friends of Russia reception in 2012 and a 10-day trip to the country, but said he had no further involvement."

Referendums

NOtoAV 
In 2011, he took a sabbatical to act as Campaign Director for the NOtoAV campaign during the 2011 United Kingdom Alternative Vote referendum. NOtoAV were successful in maintaining the current voting system, receiving 67.9% of the votes cast. He is credited with helping to turn public opinion against the alternative vote, from 2 to 1 in favour to 2 to 1 against. The large victory for the NOtoAV campaign led to Elliott being praised as "...one of the most successful political campaigners in Westminster today". Tim Montgomerie wrote that "At the moment, he's there at the very top of centre-right campaigners in Britain...He does all the things that a successful campaigner needs to do. He has message discipline, he takes opinion research incredibly seriously, he's intelligent and works hard.'

Vote Leave 

In October 2015, Elliott became the Chief executive of Vote Leave, a crossparty organisation formed to campaign to leave the European Union (EU). Vote Leave later became the official campaigning organisation to leave the EU, after having been awarded the status by the Electoral Commission. The organisation managed to recruit the support of a number of high-profile politicians, including Conservative MPs Boris Johnson and Michael Gove who became key figureheads.

Despite a widespread belief that the Vote Leave campaign was heading for defeat, nearly 52% of those who voted, or 37% of the electorate, voted to leave the EU in the 2016 referendum, therefore meaning that Elliott's campaign emerged victorious. Upon victory, Elliott was praised alongside Vote Leave Campaign Director, Dominic Cummings, as being one of the key masterminds of the victorious campaign.

In July 2018, an investigation by the UK's Electoral Commission accused Elliott's campaign of breaking UK electoral law, which Elliott denied. In September 2018 the High Court ruled that the Electoral Commission had 'misinterpreted' the electoral law in relation to Vote Leave in advice it gave.

In popular culture
Elliott was portrayed by actor John Heffernan in the HBO- and Channel 4-produced drama, Brexit: The Uncivil War (2019).

References

1978 births
Living people
Alumni of the London School of Economics
British lobbyists
British political consultants
Lobbying in the United Kingdom
People educated at Leeds Grammar School